Zakharovka is a rural locality (a village) in Paustovskoye Rural Settlement, Vyaznikovsky District, Vladimir Oblast, Russia. The population was 8 as of 2010.

Geography 
Zakharovka is located 26 km south of Vyazniki (the district's administrative centre) by road. Klimovskaya is the nearest rural locality.

References 

Rural localities in Vyaznikovsky District